The Ford Edge is a range of crossover SUVs manufactured by the Ford Motor Company. Introduced for the 2007 model year, the Edge is the first mid-size CUV marketed by Ford in North America; the model line is currently in its second generation. Deriving its name from a trim package of the Ford Ranger, the Ford Edge is positioned between the Ford Escape and the Ford Explorer within the Ford product line.

Sharing its underpinnings with the Ford Fusion sedan, Ford has also produced the model line as the Lincoln MKX (since 2019, the Lincoln Nautilus). The second generation is also marketed by Ford of Europe, positioned between the Kuga (Escape) and the Explorer PHEV.

All production of the Ford Edge is sourced from Ford of Canada at Oakville Assembly (Oakville, Ontario) alongside the Nautilus.



First generation (U387; 2007)

The first-generation Edge debuted at the 2006 North American International Auto Show in Detroit, with production starting in January 2006 as a 2007 model year.

Trim levels

The SE includes cloth seats, single-zone manual air conditioning, AM/FM stereo with single-disc CD/MP3 player, and 17-inch painted aluminum wheels.

The SEL includes unique cloth seats, six-way power driver's seat, premium AM/FM stereo with six-disc in-dash CD/MP3 player, leather-wrapped steering wheel with secondary audio controls, and 18-inch painted aluminum wheels.

The SEL Plus, later known as the Limited includes leather-trimmed seats, and optionally, six-way power front passenger fold-flat seat, EasyFold second-row seat back release, dual-zone electronic automatic temperature control, SYNC in-car connectivity system, and 18-inch premium chrome-clad aluminum wheels. The Limited trim level replaced the SEL Plus in 2008.

The Sport trim level debuted at the 2008 Chicago Auto Show, with sales beginning as a 2009 model. The trim level includes leather-trimmed with grey faux-suede inserts, reclining 60/40 fold-flat seats with center fold-down armrest, second-row seat back release (marketed as EasyFold), premium AM/FM stereo with six-disc in-dash CD/MP3 player, SYNC in-car connectivity system, large-diameter chrome exhaust tips, 20-inch premium chrome-clad aluminum wheels, all body-colored trim and optional 22-inch wheels.

Specifications

Engines

Transmission
Standard transmission is a 6F50 6-speed automatic transmission.

Safety

Safety equipment includes standard dual front airbags, front side-impact airbags, side-curtain airbags, antilock brakes, traction control, electronic stability control, and a tire-pressure monitoring system.

National Highway Traffic Safety Administration (NHTSA) crash test ratings:

Frontal driver: 
Frontal passenger: 
Side impact: 
Rollover: 

NHTSA 2011 Edge FWD crash ratings:
Frontal driver: 
Frontal passenger: 
Side driver: 
Side passenger: 
Side pole:

Awards
Ford Edge was recognized as one of the "Best Cars for Families" in 2007 by AAA and Parents Magazine.
Edge earned the IIHS "Top Safety Pick" rating for models built after January 2007
The 3.5-L Duratec 35 V6 was named one of the world's "10 Best Engines" by Ward.
Ford Edge was named "2007 Urban Truck of the Year" by On Wheels, Inc.
Edge won the J.D. Power and Associates' 2007 "APEAL Award"

HySeries concept

A concept of the Ford Edge with HySeries Drive was shown at the 2007 Washington Auto Show. The HySeries system was introduced in the Ford Airstream concept from the 2007 Detroit Auto Show.

Ford also planned to produce a gasoline-electric hybrid version of the Edge, to debut in the 2010 model year. The model was expected to use a new hybrid system from Ford, pairing an electric motor with a V6 engine. This hybrid version was later canceled.

Facelift 

The updated Ford Edge was revealed at the 2010 Chicago Auto Show, with production starting on February 12, 2010, as a 2011 model. Exterior changes include a new front fascia, wheels, and a revised bumper, while the revamped interior features upgraded materials and capacitive touch controls in place of some conventional buttons and switches, which can also be seen on the second-generation Lincoln MKX.

The turbocharger in the new 2.0-L engine is designed for 150,000 miles or 10 years.

Trim levels

In the American Range:
The SE includes cloth-trimmed seats, single-zone manual air-conditioning, steering wheel controls, and 17-inch painted aluminum wheels.

The SEL includes everything in the SE plus unique cloth-trimmed seats, six-way power driver's seat, dual-zone electronic automatic temperature controls, leather-wrapped steering wheel with cruise control, five-way switch pads and secondary audio controls, 18-inch painted aluminum wheels, reverse sensing system, and supplemental parking lamps.

The Limited includes everything in the SEL plus leather-trimmed seats, 10-way heated power driver's seat, Sony audio system with HD radio with 12 speakers in 10 locations, MyFord Touch with two driver-configurable 4.2-inch color LCD displays in cluster and 8-inch color LCD display in center stack, Ford Sync including media hub with two USB ports, SD card reader and video input jacks, 18-inch chrome-clad aluminum wheels with optional 20-inch chrome-clad aluminum wheels, rear view camera, and six-way heated power, fold-flat front passenger seat. In Israel, this trim is called SEL Plus.

Limited options include HID headlamps, a blind-spot information system, and adaptive cruise control.

The Sport includes the 3.7 L Twin-independent Variable Cam Timing V6 engine from the Mustang, six-speed SelectShift automatic transmission with paddle activation, unique charcoal black leather-trimmed seats with Silver Smoke Metallic inserts, 22-inch polished aluminum wheel with Tuxedo Black spoke accents, body-color front and rear lower fascia, 4-inch chrome oval dual exhaust tips, and body-color side lower cladding and rocker molding.

Second generation (2015)

For 2015, the Ford Edge was redesigned with a new Taurus and Explorer-like grille, new headlights, LED combination taillights, increased interior room, and a rear-view camera. This generation of the Edge comes with a standard EcoBoost engine, the all-new 2.0 L (only the displacement and bore-center spacing carry over), which has a new twin-scroll turbo to boost low-end torque figures. Unlike the previous 2.0 L EcoBoost, the 2015 generation has a towing capacity of 3500 lb and is available with all-wheel drive. The midspecification engine is a 3.5 L V6, with slightly reduced power output. The highest engine in the range, powering Sport models, is the new 2.7 L twin-turbo EcoBoost V6.

For the first time, Ford marketed the Edge in European markets (as part of the company's "One Ford" strategy); it sits above the Ford Kuga. Gasoline engines are not sold in Europe; instead, this market receives either of two turbo-charged Duratorq diesel engines as used in other Ford Europe products such as the Ford Mondeo. Both engines are mated to an all-wheel drive system as standard; no option for two-wheel drive is available. The two engines are rated at 180 hp and 210 hp. Which output the customer receives is entirely dependent on the transmission choice, with a six-speed manual as standard mated to the 180-hp unit. A six-speed PowerShift automatic dual-clutch transmission option was available, mated to the 210-hp unit.

The Ford Edge was sold in Europe as a premium large crossover with only high-end trims and diesel engines at prices 50% higher than in North America. Due to low sales, the model was limited in 2019 to only a few countries, with the last stocks sold in early 2021.

Ford Endura
The Ford Endura was the Australia/New Zealand type of the second generation Ford Edge. The Ford Endura was put on the market on December 2018, yet got discontinued in 2020 due to slow sales. It was named after the New Latin endūra, from Old Occitan endurar ("to fast, endure").

2019 facelift
The Edge (alongside the Lincoln MKX) received a mid-cycle facelift for 2019, which replaced the existing Ford three-bar front grille with a design similar to the larger Ford Explorer, new aluminum-alloy wheel options, new exterior and interior color combinations, and a 12-speaker B&O Play surround-sound system that replaced the Sony system. All models received a new Ford 8F35 eight-speed automatic transmission (featuring automatic stop-start technology), which also allows the base 2.0 L EcoBoost turbocharged I4 engine to gain a  boost, and improved EPA fuel economy.

With the launch of the 2018 model in Australia (February 2019 in New Zealand), the Edge is sold as the Ford Endura, and is the successor to the Ford Territory. In Australia, the Endura was made available in Trend, ST-Line, and Titanium trim levels. The Endura was discontinued in Australia by the end of 2020. It had been discontinued in New Zealand prior to this.

The 2019 Ford Edge was offered in nine exterior colors, some of which were new for 2019.

In addition, the 2019 Edge offered three new safety technologies:

 Post-collision braking automatically applies brake pressure when a collision event is detected.
 Evasive steering assist helps drivers in steering around stopped or slower vehicles to avoid a possible collision.
 Adaptive cruise control with stop-and-go lane centering allows the vehicle to maintain a comfortable driving distance and helps reduce stress during longer drives.

The 2019 Edge made its debut at the 2018 North American International Auto Show in Detroit, and went on sale in the spring of 2018 as an early 2019 model year vehicle.

For the 2020 model year, dual-zone automatic climate control was included on all trims. However, the CD player was removed.

Edge Plus (China, 2021 facelift) 
The Edge in China was facelifted with the rest of the world in 2019 while receiving another facelift for the 2021 model year exclusively for the Chinese three-row Edge called the Ford Edge Plus. The Edge Plus features a slightly redesigned exterior and a different interior design. The interior features two new displays measuring 8 and 13.2 inches across and a new squared-off multi-function steering wheel. The updated center console houses both the climate controls and the air vents, while a cover below conceals a power socket, a single USB port and a wireless charger. Both FWD and AWD are offered.

2021 model year changes 
For the 2021 model year, the Ford Edge gained a standard twelve-inch, tablet-style touchscreen infotainment system screen, with wireless Apple CarPlay and Android Auto smartphone integration, as well as standard SiriusXM satellite radio with 360L. A new "ST-Line" trim, based on the mid-level Edge SEL, added ST-inspired exterior and interior styling, a unique ActiveX (leatherette)-trimmed interior, and unique black-finished aluminum-alloy wheels, but is powered by the base 2.0L EcoBoost four-cylinder engine mated to an eight-speed automatic transmission. The Edge Titanium gained a new Titanium Elite Package, which added a unique interior color scheme, model-specific exterior styling cues, and larger tires with unique aluminum-alloy wheels.

Edge ST 

Ford also offered a new model of the Edge, the ST, instead of the Sport as the top trim level for the line.  It features a 2.7 L EcoBoost twin-turbocharged V6 engine producing , a modest  increase over the 2018 Sport, which used the same engine. ST styling includes a dark-finished mesh front grille, aluminum-alloy wheels, and unique interior.

Powertrain

Safety 

1 vehicle structure rated "Good"
2 strength-to-weight ratio: 5.11

Third generation (2023)

The third-generation Edge was released in 2023 for the Chinese market as the Ford Edge L. It is a mid-size SUV with three rows of seats, available with gasoline and plug-in hybrid powertrains.

Sales

References

External links

Edge
Crossover sport utility vehicles
Mid-size sport utility vehicles
Ford CD3 platform
All-wheel-drive vehicles
Front-wheel-drive vehicles
2010s cars
2020s cars
Plug-in hybrid vehicles
Cars introduced in 2006
Goods manufactured in Canada
Ford CD4 platform